The 32nd Golden Globe Awards, honoring the best in film and television for 1974, were held on January 25, 1975.

Winners and nominees
The winners are first and in bold followed by the rest of the nominees.

Film

Television

Best Series - Drama
 Upstairs, Downstairs 
Columbo
Kojak
Police Story
The Streets of San Francisco
The Waltons

Best Series - Comedy or Musical
 Rhoda 
All in the Family
The Carol Burnett Show
The Mary Tyler Moore Show
Maude

Best Actor - Drama Series
 Telly Savalas – Kojak 
Mike Connors – Mannix
Michael Douglas – The Streets of San Francisco
Peter Falk – Columbo
Richard Thomas – The Waltons

Best Actress - Drama Series
 Angie Dickinson – Police Woman 
Teresa Graves – Get Christie Love!
Michael Learned – The Waltons
Jean Marsh – Upstairs, Downstairs
Emily McLaughlin – General Hospital
Lee Meriwether – Barnaby Jones

Best Actor - Comedy or Musical Series
 Alan Alda – M*A*S*H 
Edward Asner – Mary Tyler Moore
Redd Foxx – Sanford and Son
Bob Newhart – The Bob Newhart Show
Carroll O'Connor – All in the Family

Best Actress - Comedy or Musical Series
 Valerie Harper – Rhoda 
Carol Burnett – The Carol Burnett Show
Mary Tyler Moore – The Mary Tyler Moore Show
Esther Rolle – Good Times
Jean Stapleton – All in the Family

Best Supporting Actor
 Harvey Korman – The Carol Burnett Show 	 
Will Geer – The Waltons
Gavin MacLeod – The Mary Tyler Moore Show
Whitman Mayo – Sanford and Son
Jimmie Walker – Good Times

Best Supporting Actress
 Betty Garrett – All in the Family 
Ellen Corby – The Waltons
Julie Kavner – Rhoda
Vicki Lawrence – The Carol Burnett Show
Nancy Walker – McMillan & Wife

References

External links
IMdb 1975 Golden Globe Awards

032
1974 film awards
1974 television awards
January 1975 events in the United States
Golden Globe